Het vind (Hot Wind) is the debut studio album by Swedish singer-songwriter Marie Fredriksson, originally released on LP and Cassette formats on 20 September 1984 by EMI Sweden. The album was preceded by its lead single, "Ännu doftar kärlek" ("Still the Scent of Love"), and both that single and the album became top twenty hits in her native country.

The title track was released as the second and final single, although it failed to chart. This single was backed by a Swedish cover of Cyndi Lauper's "All Through the Night", which was translated by producer Lars-Göran "Lasse" Lindbom, and re-titled "Natt efter natt" ("Night After Night"). This song was included as a bonus track when the album was released on CD for the first time on 2 June 1987.

Background and recording
The album was recorded with many of the same musicians who featured on Per Gessle's 1983 debut solo album, with whom Fredriksson would later form pop duo Roxette. Gessle composed two songs for the record: "Tag detta hjärta" ("Take This Heart") and "Rickie Lee", although the latter was not selected for inclusion. Gessle's own recording of the song subsequently appeared on his 1985 album Scener, and Fredriksson's version would remain unreleased until Het vind was remastered and reissued on CD in 2003.

Unlike the power pop of Fredriksson's previous band MaMas Barn (MaMas Children) – which she formed in the late 70's with her then-boyfriend Martin Sternhufvud, who also wrote one song for the album: "Jag ska ge allt" ("I'll Give Everything"), Het vind is a relatively contemporary record. The material differs from her previous band in that it has a more soft rock lean, and several songs feature arrangements indicative of Roxette's later 
hit power ballads, such as "Listen to Your Heart" and "Fading Like a Flower (Every Time You Leave)". A number of other songs contain elements of disco and 80s synth-pop.

Formats and track listings

Personnel
Credits adapted from the liner notes of Het vind.

 Marie Fredriksson – vocals, backing vocals and synthesizer
 Per "Pelle" Andersson – backing vocals and drums
 "Backa" Hans Eriksson – bass
 Jan "Nane" Kvillsäter – electric guitars
 Lars-Göran "Lasse" Lindbom – backing vocals, percussion, acoustic guitar and production
 Hans "Hasse" Olsson – keyboards
 Per "Pelle" Sirén – electric guitars
 Niklas Strömstedt – backing vocals

Technical personnel
 Björn Almstedt – mastering
 Kjell Andersson – sleeve design
 Calle Bengtsson – photography
 Björn Boström – engineering

Charts

Release history

References

1984 debut albums
Marie Fredriksson albums